Greatest & Latest may refer to:

 Greatest & Latest (Dee Dee Ramone album), 2000
 Greatest & Latest (Warrant album), 1999

See also 
 Latest & Greatest, a 2000 album by Great White